Alessandro Capone (born 25 July 1955) is an Italian film director and screenwriter. He has directed 15 films since 1989.

Selected filmography
 Body Count (1987 film) (1987, writer)
 Witch Story (Le Streghe) (1989, writer/ director)
 Les secrets professionnels du Dr Apfelglück (1991, director)
 Hidden Love (2007)
 I delitti del cuoco (2010)
 2047 Sights of Death (2014)

References

External links
 
 

1955 births
Living people
Italian film directors
20th-century Italian screenwriters
21st-century Italian screenwriters
Writers from Rome
Italian male screenwriters